Reece Robinson (born 15 May 1992 from Hull) is an English professional darts player who competes in Professional Darts Corporation events.

Career

Robinson came to prominence in major darts at the 2010 UK Open along with fellow young players Joe Cullen, William O'Connor and Arron Monk. He reached the last 64 before losing to PDC World Darts Championship finalist Simon Whitlock by 9 legs to 5. Later that year, he won the Winmau World Youth Masters, defeating Kurtis Atkins in the final.

Robinson joined the PDC Pro Tour in 2011. He received a one-month ban from the Pro Tour in February 2011, for "dangerous and reckless throwing of darts" at a Youth Tour event in Derby.
At the 2011 UK Open, he reached the last 32, defeating Barrie Bates, Wayne Mardle, and Wayne Jones along the way. His run was ended as he narrowly lost 9–8 to Andy Smith. On 11 June 2011, Robinson won his maiden PDC Youth Tour event in Barnsley, beating Shaun Griffiths 4–0 in the final.

In May 2012, he earned a place in the German Darts Championship in Berlin by defeating Ian Jopling in the UK qualifier. He beat Richie Burnett in the first round 6–2, before losing to fifteen time world champion Phil Taylor 6–2 in round two. He also reached the fourth European Tour Event, the German Darts Masters and was defeated by Colin Osborne 6–2 in the first round in Stuttgart.

Robinson headed into 2013 ranked number 85 in the world. He played in the majority of Challenge Tour events and was a losing semi-finalist twice before he reached the final of the 16th event where he lost 4–0 to Dimitri van den Bergh. In January 2014 he entered Q School in an attempt to earn a two-year PDC tour card, but he could not advance beyond the last 128 on any of the four days.

Robinson based his 2014 around Youth and Challenge Tour events. He lost in the final of the eighth Youth Tour event 4–2 to James Hubbard, but won the 12th event by beating Van den Bergh 4–2. Robinson also reached the quarter-finals of the Under-21 World Championship, where Kurt Parry knocked him out 6–3.

The best Robinson could do in 2015 and 2016 was one quarter-final in a Development Tour event.

2017 saw Robinson start to ply his trade on the PDC Challenge Tour without overwhelming success, a last 16 his best result in the year. However, a weekend in May 2018 seemed to change his fortunes as he made two last 16s and a last 32 before reaching a semi-final in the final Challenge Tour weekend of the year. This stood him in good stead going into PDC UK Q-School in January 2019 as he beat three-time BDO World Champion Glen Durrant 5–2 on the final of day three to seal a two-year PDC Tour Card and win it back after six years without one.

References

External links

1992 births
English darts players
Sportspeople from Kingston upon Hull
Living people
Professional Darts Corporation former tour card holders